Group A of the 2004 Copa América was one of the three groups of competing nations in the 2004 Copa América. It comprised Bolivia, Colombia, Peru, and Venezuela. Group play ran from 6 to 12 July 2004.

Colombia won the group and faced Costa Rica, the second-best third-placed finishers, in the quarter-finals. Peru finished second and faced Argentina—the runners-up of Group B—in the quarter-finals. Bolivia and Venezuela finished third and fourth in the group, respectively, and were eliminated from the tournament.

Standings

All times are in local, Peru Time (UTC−05:00).

Matches

Venezuela vs Colombia

Peru vs Bolivia

Colombia vs Bolivia

Peru vs Venezuela

Venezuela vs Bolivia

Peru vs Colombia

External links
Copa América 2004 Official Site

Group A
2004 in Peruvian football
2004 in Colombian football
2004 in Bolivian football
Venezuela at the 2004 Copa América